Ryan Morrison, commonly known as Video Game Attorney, was born in Huntington Station, New York, to Laurie and Patrick Morrison. Morrison worked full-time during high school, saving up money to attend college. Once there, his father committed identity theft against both Morrison and his grandmother, resulting in Morrison having to drop out of college.  Currently, Morrison is a United States attorney and e-sports agent who specializes in law of interest to fans of video games and Internet culture. He is the CEO and founder of Evolved Talent Agency and one of the founding partners of Morrison Rothman LLP. On average, Morrison represents over 200 clients. Morrison has earned the reputation of a sort of hero to video game developers, helping them stand up to the bullies of the video game industry.

Ryan Morrison is helping gaming stars and their teams revamp deals with major gaming organizations.

In law school, Morrison worked with Professors Michelle Zierler and Jethro Leiberman to bring attention to the injustice surrounding the West Memphis Three [RM1] by writing various articles and organizing the first live interview with Damien Echols once he was released from death row.

Social media usage and views
Morrison's habit of participating in Reddit has been analyzed as a business marketing strategy. He advocates for independent developers of popular Internet media and video games.

Morrison became a center of attention in the React World controversy when the Reddit community and others began to call on him for his legal insights on copyright and his engagement in copyright activism. His participation in the issue was an important factor in the resolution of the issue in favor of the activists.

References

External links

Living people
Computer law activists
American Internet celebrities
American civil rights lawyers
Reddit people
21st-century American lawyers
Year of birth missing (living people)